Shand-e Dinar (also Romanized as Shand-e Dīnār; also known as Pāsgāh-e Shandīnār and Pāsgāh-e Jadīdich) is a village in Bandan Rural District, in the Central District of Nehbandan County, South Khorasan Province, Iran. At the 2006 census, its population was 65, in 11 families.

References 

Populated places in Nehbandan County
Afghanistan–Iran border crossings